Let the Devil Wear Black is a 1999 crime thriller film directed by Stacy Title, co-written by Title and her husband, actor Jonathan Penner.  The film is a modern retelling of the classic play Hamlet.

Background
The film is a modern-day version of William Shakespeare's Hamlet set in Los Angeles. Its promotional tagline is "Something is Rotten in the City of Angels".

The film reworks various Shakespearean plot devices. All of the language is modern. Comparisons are easy to spot between the play and the film if the person is familiar with the play. Even with it being based on Hamlet, Christopher Null of Film Critic said that it still has enough originality. Before the film was rated, Joe Leydon of Variety said that a couple of relatively explicit sex scenes would have to be cut if the producers wanted an R rating.

Plot
Jack, a grad student who has a history of mental illness can not get over the death of his father. Jack decides to take over his father's business. After receiving an anonymous tip that his father was murdered, he tries to put together the murder scheme. Soon after, he settles on his uncle Carl as the prime suspect.  At the same time, he realizes that his life is in danger.

Cast
 Jonathan Penner as Jack Lyne
 Randall Batinkoff as Bradbury
 Norman Reedus as Brautigan
 Jacqueline Bisset as Helen Lyne
 Mary-Louise Parker as Julia Hirsch
 Jamey Sheridan as Carl Lyne
 Chris Sarandon as Mr. Lyne
 Andrea Martin as April
 Philip Baker Hall as Sol Hirsch
 Joanna Gleason as Dr. Rona Harvey
 Jonathan Banks as Satch

DVD release
The DVD was released in 2000 in English and German. The DVD has 15 chapters, Dolby Digital 5.1 sound, pan and scan transfer, Spanish subtitles, and a moving video scene index menu. The special features are behind the scenes footage and two versions of the film's movie trailer.

Reception
A Reel Film review said the actors are good and that the somber tone makes the film watchable. Christopher Null, of Film Critic, said that the film's most priceless moment is when the character Ophelia samples dog food.

References

External links 

1999 films
1999 crime thriller films
Films based on Hamlet
Films set in Los Angeles
Films shot in Los Angeles
Modern adaptations of works by William Shakespeare
American neo-noir films
Films scored by Christophe Beck
Films directed by Stacy Title
Trimark Pictures films
1990s English-language films
1990s American films